The 1976 Centennial Cup is the sixth Tier II Junior "A" 1976 ice hockey National Championship for the Canadian Junior A Hockey League.

The Centennial Cup was competed for by the winners of the Western Canadian Champions and the Eastern Canadian Champions.

The finals were hosted by the Rockland Nationals in the city of Rockland, Ontario.

The Playoffs

Prior to the Regionals
Rockland Nationals (CJHL) defeated Lac Megantic Royals (QJAHL) 4-games-to-1
Charlottetown Colonels (IJHL) defeated St. John's (NLJHL) 4-games-to-2
Guelph Platers (SOJHL) defeated Thunder Bay Eagles (TBJHL) 4-games-to-1
Guelph Platers (SOJHL) defeated North Bay Trappers (OPJHL) 4-games-to-1

MCC Finals

Regional Championships
Manitoba Centennial Cup: Rockland Nationals

Abbott Cup: Spruce Grove Mets
Eastern Champions: Pembroke Lumber Kings

Doyle Cup: Spruce Grove Mets
Anavet Cup: Selkirk Steelers
Dudley Hewitt Cup: Rockland Nationals
Callaghan Cup: Charlottetown Islanders

Roll of League Champions
AJHL: Spruce Grove Mets
BCJHL: Nanaimo Clippers
CJHL: Rockland Nationals
EJHL: Sydney Millionaires
IJHL: Charlottetown Colonels
MJHL: Selkirk Steelers
NBJHL: St. John 77's
OPJHL: North Bay Trappers
PacJHL: Nor Wes Caps
QJAHL: Lac-Megantic Royals
SJHL: Prince Albert Raiders
SOJAHL: Guelph Platers
TBJHL: Thunder Bay Eagles

Awards
Most Valuable Player: Gerry Leroux (Rockland Nationals)

See also
Canadian Junior A Hockey League
Royal Bank Cup
Anavet Cup
Doyle Cup
Dudley Hewitt Cup
Fred Page Cup
Abbott Cup
Mowat Cup

External links
Royal Bank Cup Website

1976
1975–76 in Canadian ice hockey